Computational and Structural Biotechnology Journal is a peer-reviewed open access scientific journal, published by Elsevier on behalf of the Research Network of Computational and Structural Biotechnology, covering all aspects of computational and structural biology. It was established in 2012 by Gupta Udatha and the editor-in-chief is Gianni Panagiotou (Hans Knöll Institute).

Abstracting and indexing
The journal is abstracted and indexed in Chemical Abstracts Service, Global Health, Proquest databases, and Scopus.

References

External links
 

Publications established in 2012
Creative Commons Attribution-licensed journals
English-language journals
Elsevier academic journals
Bioinformatics and computational biology journals